The Ministry of Communication and Technology of the Syrian Arab Republic is the ministry that is responsible for the enforcement of government communications and information policies.

Ministers of Communication and Technology
 Radwan Martini (2000 – 13 December 2001)
 Mohammad Bashir al-Monjed (13 December 2001 – 21 February 2006)
 Amr Nazir Salem (21 February 2006 – 8 December 2007)
 Imad Abdel Ghani Sabouni (8 December 2007 – 27 August 2014)
 Mohammed Ghazi al-Jalali (27 August 2014 - 3 July 2016)
 Ali al-Dhafir (3 July 2016 – 28 November 2018)
 Iyad Mohammad al-Khatib (28 November 2018 – incumbent)

References

External links
 Ministry of Communication and Technology Official Website (Arabic) (English)

Syria
Communications and Technology
Organizations based in Damascus